Germán Nicolás Tivani Pérez (born 31 October 1995) is an Argentine cyclist, who currently rides for UCI ProTeam .

For the 2021 season, Tivani had been scheduled to join the  team, but ultimately remained with the  team, which had dropped down from UCI Continental team level.

Major results

2012
 1st  Road race, National Junior Road Championships
2013 
 6th Overall Ronde des Vallées
 9th Overall Grand Prix Rüebliland
2015
 National Under-23 Road Championships
3rd Time trial
4th Road race
 9th Road race, Pan American Under-23 Road Championships
2016
 1st Stage 5 Tour de San Luis
 1st Stage 10 Tour du Maroc
 9th Road race, Pan American Under-23 Road Championships
2017
 National Under-23 Road Championships
1st  Road race
1st  Time trial
 1st Ruota d'Oro
 Pan American Under-23 Road Championships
2nd  Road race
3rd  Time trial
 4th Overall Tour of Bulgaria – North
1st  Young rider classification
1st Stage 2b
 4th Trofeo Edil C
 6th Trofeo Alcide Degasperi
 8th Overall Tour of Bulgaria – South
1st  Young rider classification
 10th Memorial Marco Pantani
2018 
 1st  Overall Tour de Serbie
1st Stage 1
 3rd Overall Tour of Mersin
1st Points classification
 3rd Overall Belgrade–Banja Luka
 3rd GP Kranj
 6th GP Izola
 8th GP Adria Mobil
 10th GP Industria & Artigianato di Larciano
2019
 1st Stage 6 Vuelta a San Juan
 3rd Overall Vuelta del Uruguay
1st Stages 2 & 9 
2022
 1st  Overall Vuelta del Porvenir San Luis
1st Stages 2 & 4 
 1st  Overall Vuelta a Formosa Internacional
1st  Points classification
1st Stages 2b & 4

References

External links

1995 births
Living people
Argentine male cyclists
Cyclists at the 2019 Pan American Games
Pan American Games competitors for Argentina
21st-century Argentine people
Sportspeople from San Juan Province, Argentina